Mary Ann was launched in 1807 at Liverpool. She made one voyage as a slave ship in the triangular trade in enslaved people. She then became a West Indiaman. From 1811 she became a Falmouth packet. In 1813 a United States privateer captured her.

Career
Mary Ann first appeared in Lloyd's Register (LR) in 1807.

Captain John Ainsworth acquired a letter of marque on 5 May 1807. He sailed from Liverpool on 29 May 1807. Mary Ann acquired slaves at the Congo River.

As Mary Ann was on her way to the West Indies she encountered the sloop . Rattler detained Mary Ann and sent her into Barbados, where she was later released. Mary Ann had sailed after 1 May, the day that the Slave Trade Act 1807, which banned British vessels from engaging in the slave trade, took effect. However, evidently she had cleared outbound prior to 1 May and so her voyage was among the last legal British slave trading voyages.

Mary Ann arrived at Barbados on 13 February 1808 with 207 slaves. She landed 32 there and sailed on to Demerara. She arrived back at Liverpool on 21 June 1808.

Lloyd's Register continued to carry Mary Ann until 1814, but with data unchanged since 1807. However, although the Register of Shipping (RS) is not available in online form between 1807 and 1808, she did appear in the volume for 1809 as a West Indiaman.

In 1811 Mary Ann became a Post Office packet, sailing out of Falmouth.

Fate
The United States privateer  captured Mary Ann in early April 1813 as Mary Ann was 50 leagues west of Cape St Vincent while on her way from Malta to Gibraltar (and Falmouth). Governor Tompkins had a crew of 99 men and was armed with ten 9-pounder guns and one long 24-pounder on a traverse. By the time Captain Caddy struck, Mary Ann had been reduced to a mere wreck. Mary Ann arrived at Boston on 21 May. Mary Ann had one man killed and several wounded; General Tompkins was carrying $60,000 in gold and bullion. she had thrown her mails overboard before she was captured, but they were inadequately weighted and were retrieved.

After an engagement lasting three-quarters of an hour Governor Tompkins was able to escape. She made her way back to the United States. Governor Tompkins may have been captured on her next cruise.

Citations

References
 

1807 ships
Liverpool slave ships
Age of Sail merchant ships of England
Packet (sea transport)
Falmouth Packets
Captured ships